The 2015 Myanmar National League (known as the Ooredoo Myanmar National League for sponsorship reasons) is the 6th season of the Myanmar National League, the top Burmese professional league for association football clubs. The first round of the season began on 10 January 2015, with the last round ending on 31 October 2015. The Myanmar National League will be temporarily suspended for three months from 8 March to 22 June due to the 2015 Southeast Asian Games held in Singapore. The 2015 transfer window for Myanmar National League clubs will open from 19 May 2015 to 18 June 2015.

Yadarnarbon came in as the champions of the 2014 Myanmar National League. Hanthawaddy United and Rakhine United entered as the two promoted teams from the 2014 Myanmar National League 2.

Events

This season will be the first Myanmar National League season to have Ooredoo as the title sponsor, after penning a deal worth US $1.5 million per year on 20 March 2015.

Teams
A total of 12 teams will compete in the league: 10 sides from the 2014 season and two promoted teams from the 2014 Myanmar National League 2. The two promoted clubs replace Southern Myanmar United and Gospel For Asia.

Stadium

Personnel and sponsoring
Note: Flags indicate national team as has been defined under FIFA eligibility rules. Players may hold more than one non-FIFA nationality.

Foreign players
The number of foreign players is restricted to four per club, including a slot for a player from AFC countries.

Result

League table

Result table

Matches

Fixtures and Results of the Myanmar National League 2015 season.

Week 1

Week 2

Week 3

Week 4

Week 5

Week 6

Week 7

Week 8

Week 9

Week 10

Week 11

Week 12

Week 13

Week 14

Week 15

Week 17

Week 18

Week 19

Week 16

Week 20

Week 21

Week 22

Top scorers

Summary
 Yangon United won the 2015 MNL champion.
 Ayeyawady United won the 2015 General Aung San Shield champion.
 César Augusto scored 28 league goals and won golden boot.
 Manaw Myay and  Nay Pyi Taw relegated to MNL-2. First time for Nay Pyi Taw.
 Yangon United was a best attacking team (61 goals) and Magwe was a best defending team (23 goals).
 Three local players include in 2015 MNL Top 1–5 Soccers List. 
 Yangon United got 2016 AFC Champions League entrance and Ayeyawady United got 2016 AFC Cup entrance.

References

 Myanmar National League Facebook Official Page

External links
 Myanmar National League Official Website
 Myanmar National League Facebook Official Page

Myanmar National League seasons
1
Myanmar
Myanmar